Lynn Rachel Redgrave  (8 March 1943 – 2 May 2010) was an English actress. She won two Golden Globe Awards throughout her career.

A member of the Redgrave family of actors, Lynn trained in London before making her theatrical debut in 1962. By the mid-1960s, she had appeared in several films, including Tom Jones (1963) and Georgy Girl (1966), which won her a New York Film Critics Award, a Golden Globe Award for Best Actress in a Musical/Comedy, as well as earning her a nomination for the Academy Award for Best Actress.

She made her Broadway debut in 1967 and performed in several stage productions in New York City while making frequent returns to London's West End. Redgrave performed with her sister Vanessa in Three Sisters in London, and in the title role of Baby Jane Hudson in a television production of What Ever Happened to Baby Jane? in 1991.

She made a return to cinema in the late 1990s, in films such as Shine (1996) and Gods and Monsters (1998), for which she received her second Academy Award nomination and won a Golden Globe Award For Best Supporting Actress. Lynn Redgrave is the only person to have been nominated for all of the 'Big Four' American entertainment awards (Emmy, Grammy, Oscar, and Tony, collectively known when all four have been won as "EGOT") without winning any of them.

Early life and theatrical family

Redgrave was born in Marylebone, London, the youngest child of actors Sir Michael Redgrave and Rachel Kempson. Her sister is actress Vanessa Redgrave; her brother was actor and political activist Corin Redgrave. She was the aunt of writer/director Carlo Gabriel Nero and of actresses Joely Richardson, Jemma Redgrave and Natasha Richardson, and the sister-in-law of director Tony Richardson, actress Kika Markham and Italian actor Franco Nero. Her grandfather was silent screen leading man Roy Redgrave.

Career

After training at London's Central School of Speech and Drama, Redgrave made her professional debut in a 1962 production of A Midsummer Night's Dream at the Royal Court Theatre. Following a tour of Billy Liar and repertory work in Dundee, she made her West End debut at the Haymarket, in N. C. Hunter's The Tulip Tree with Celia Johnson and John Clements.

She was invited to join the National Theatre for its inaugural season at the Old Vic, working with such directors as Laurence Olivier, Franco Zeffirelli, and Noël Coward in roles such as Rose in The Recruiting Officer, Barblin in Andorra, Jackie in Hay Fever, Kattrin in Mother Courage, Miss Prue in Love for Love, and Margaret in Much Ado About Nothing which kept her busy for the next three years.

During that time, she appeared in films such as Tom Jones (1963), Girl with Green Eyes (1964), The Deadly Affair (1966), and the title role in Georgy Girl (also 1966, and which featured her mother, Rachel Kempson). For the last of these roles, she gained the New York Film Critics Award, the Golden Globe, and an Oscar nomination.

In 1967, she made her Broadway debut in Black Comedy with Michael Crawford and Geraldine Page. London appearances included Michael Frayn's The Two of Us with Richard Briers at the Garrick, David Hare's Slag at the Royal Court, and Born Yesterday, directed by Tom Stoppard at Greenwich in 1973.

Redgrave returned to Broadway in 1974, in My Fat Friend. There soon followed Knock Knock with Charles Durning, Mrs. Warren's Profession (for a Tony nomination) with Ruth Gordon, and Saint Joan. In the 1985–1986 season she appeared with Rex Harrison, Claudette Colbert, and Jeremy Brett in Aren't We All?, and with Mary Tyler Moore in A. R. Gurney's Sweet Sue.

In 1983, Redgrave played Cleopatra in an American television version of Antony and Cleopatra opposite Timothy Dalton. She was in Misalliance in Chicago with Irene Worth (earning the Sarah Siddons and Joseph Jefferson awards), Twelfth Night at the American Shakespeare Festival, California Suite, The King and I, Hellzapoppin''', Les Dames du Jeudi, Les Liaisons Dangereuses, and The Cherry Orchard. In 1988, she narrated a dramatised television documentary, Silent Mouse, which told the story of the creation of the Christmas carol Silent Night. She starred with Stewart Granger and Ricardo Montalbán in a Hollywood production of Don Juan in Hell in the early winter of 1991.

With her sister Vanessa as Olga, she returned to the London stage playing Masha in Three Sisters in 1991 at the Queen's Theatre, London, and later played the title role in a television production of Whatever Happened to Baby Jane? again with her sister. Highlights of her early film career also include The National Health, Everything You Always Wanted to Know About Sex* (*But Were Afraid to Ask), The Happy Hooker and Getting It Right. In the United States she was seen in such television series as Teachers Only, House Calls, Centennial and Chicken Soup.

She also starred in BBC productions such as The Faint-Hearted Feminist, A Woman Alone, Death of a Son, Calling the Shots and Fighting Back. She played Broadway again in Moon Over Buffalo (1996) with co-star Robert Goulet, and starred in the world premiere of Tennessee Williams' The Notebook of Trigorin, based on Anton Chekhov's The Seagull. She won the Drama Desk Award for Outstanding Featured Actress in a Play for her performance in Talking Heads.

Redgrave became well-known in the United States after appearing in the television series House Calls, for which she received an Emmy nomination. She was fired from the series after she insisted on bringing her child to rehearsals so as to continue a breastfeeding schedule. A lawsuit ensued but was dismissed a few years later. Following that, she appeared in a long-running series of television commercials for H. J. Heinz Company, then the manufacturer of the weight loss foods for Weight Watchers, a Heinz subsidiary. Her signature line for the ads was "This Is Living, Not Dieting!". She wrote a book of her life experiences with the same title, which included a selection of Weight Watchers recipes. The autobiographical section later became the basis of her one-woman play Shakespeare for My Father.

In 1989, she appeared on Broadway in Love Letters with her husband John Clark, and thereafter they performed the play around the country, on one occasion for the jury in the O. J. Simpson case. In 1993, she appeared on Broadway in the one-woman play Shakespeare for My Father, which Clark produced and directed. She was nominated for the Tony Award for Best Actress in a Play. In 1993, she was elected president of the Players' Club.

She also hosted segments for the Encore True Stories premium cable network in the late 1990s and 2000s.

In 2005, Redgrave appeared at Quinnipiac University and Connecticut College in the play Sisters of the Garden, about the sisters Fanny and Rebekka Mendelssohn and Nadia and Lili Boulanger. She was also reported to be writing a one-woman play about her battle with breast cancer and her 2003 mastectomy, based on her book Journal: A Mother and Daughter's Recovery from Breast Cancer with photos by her daughter Annabel and text by Redgrave herself.

In September 2006 she appeared in Nightingale, the U.S. premiere of her new one-woman play based upon her maternal grandmother Beatrice, at Los Angeles' Mark Taper Forum. She also performed the play in May 2007 at Hartford Stage in Hartford, Connecticut. In 2007, she appeared in an episode of Desperate Housewives as Dahlia Hainsworth, the mother of Susan Delfino's boyfriend Ian Hainsworth.

She also appeared in an episode of ABC's television series Ugly Betty and an episode of Law & Order: Criminal Intent.

In 2009, she was inducted into the American Theatre Hall of Fame.

Voice work
Redgrave narrated approximately 20 audiobooks, including Prince Caspian: The Chronicles of Narnia by C. S. Lewis for Harper Audio and Inkheart by Cornelia Funke for Listening Library.

Personal life
On 2 April 1967, Lynn Redgrave married English actor John Clark. Together they had three children. Her marriage to Clark was dissolved in 2000, two years after he revealed that he had had an affair with her personal assistant, Nicolette Hannah, and that Lynn's supposed grandson Zachary was in fact Clark's own son by Hannah, who had married (and subsequently divorced) their son Benjamin. The divorce proceedings were acrimonious and became front-page news, with Clark alleging that Redgrave had also been unfaithful.

Redgrave was appointed an Officer of the Order of the British Empire in the 2002 New Year Honours for services to acting and the cinema and to the British community in Los Angeles. She was a naturalised citizen of the United States. 

Death
Redgrave discussed her health problems associated with bulimia and breast cancer. She was diagnosed with breast cancer in December 2002, had a mastectomy in January 2003, and underwent chemotherapy. She died from breast cancer at her home in Kent, Connecticut on 2 May 2010, aged 67.

Redgrave's funeral was held on 8 May 2010 at the First Congregational Church in Kent. She was interred in St Peter's Episcopal Cemetery in the hamlet of Lithgow, New York, where her mother Rachel Kempson and her niece Natasha Richardson are also interred.

In 2012, the Folger Shakespeare Library acquired Redgrave's collection of personal papers and photographs.

Legacy
In 2013, the Lynn Redgrave Theater was opened Off-Broadway in New York City; it was previously known as the Bleecker Street Theater.

 Filmography 
Film

Television

Theatre

Awards and nominations

In 2001, Lynn Redgrave received a LIVING LEGEND honor at The WINFemme Film Festival and The Women's Network Image Awards.

References

External links

 
 
 
 
 
 Lynn Redgrave – Downstage Center'' interview at American Theatre Wing.org, July 2005.
 Write TV Public Television interview

1943 births
2010 deaths
20th-century English dramatists and playwrights
20th-century English actresses
21st-century English actresses
Actresses from London
Alumni of the Royal Central School of Speech and Drama
Best Musical or Comedy Actress Golden Globe (film) winners
Best Supporting Actress Golden Globe (film) winners
Deaths from breast cancer
Deaths from cancer in Connecticut
Drama Desk Award winners
English emigrants to the United States
English film actresses
English stage actresses
English television actresses
English voice actresses
Independent Spirit Award for Best Supporting Female winners
Officers of the Order of the British Empire
People from Kent, Connecticut
People from Marylebone
Redgrave family